Nishijima (written: 西島 or 西嶋) is a Japanese surname. Notable people with the surname include:

 Gudō Wafu Nishijima (1919–2014), Japanese Zen Buddhist priest and teacher
 Hidetoshi Nishijima (actor) (born 1971), Japanese actor
 Hidetoshi Nishijima (politician) (born 1948), Japanese politician
 Hiroyuki Nishijima (born 1982), Japanese football player
 Katsuhiko Nishijima (born 1960), Japanese anime director
 Kazuhiko Nishijima (1926–2009), Japanese physicist
 Takahiro Nishijima (born 1986), Japanese singer and actor
 Yōsuke Nishijima (born 1973), Japanese professional boxer

Japanese-language surnames